''Premium Pension Limited (PPL)''' is a leading Pension Fund Administrator (PFA) in Nigeria
which provides a range of products and services to clients based in over 10 states of Nigeria. Premium Pension Limited is licensed by the National Pension Commission in December 2005, under the new Pension Reform Act, 2004. The company took off in 2005 with an initial share capital of ₦500 million but has grown to a total shareholders’ funds of ₦1.3 billion.

The National Pension Commission

The vision of the organization is to ensure the prompt payment of retirement benefits and promote a sustainable pension industry that positively impacts on the economic development of Nigeria.

Their mission is to be an effective regulate and supervisor that ensures the safety of pension assets and fair return on investment, using appropriate technology, with highly skilled and motivated staff.

Premium Pension Limited is organised as a network, comprising six business divisions: Retirement Savings Account, Additional Voluntary Contribution (AVC), Legacy Asset Management, Pension Advisory Service and Cross Border Pension Plan

History
Premium Pension was licensed in December 2005 by the National Pension Commission. Premium Pension Limited took off with an initial share capital of ₦500 million but has grown to a total shareholders’ funds of over ₦900 billion, as at December 2021.
In August 2015, Premium Pension Limited was conferred with the Award for Mass Mobilisation of Pension Asset, at the  Commerce and Industry Awards by the Lagos Chambers of Commerce and Industry, LCCI.
In November 2015, Premium Pension Limited received the UK’s International Organization for Standardization (ISO) certificate on information security management system by the British Standard Institute, becoming the first Pension Fund Administrator (PFA) in Nigeria to receive the certification. Premium also received certification on Information Security Management System (ISMS) by the British Standard Institute in 2013

Operations
Premium Pension Limited is staffed by professionals in areas of Investment, IT, Customer Service, Marketing and Operations.
Premium Pension Limited has branches and service centres located across the 36 states of Nigeria, including the FCT.

Certifications
2013: certificate on Information Security Management System (ISMS) by the British Standard Institute
2015: International Organization for Standardization (ISO) 27001 and 9001 certificates on information security management system by the British Standard Institute;
2015: Award for Mass Mobilisation of Pension Asset conferred at the 2015 Commerce and Industry Awards by the Lagos Chambers of Commerce and Industry, LCCI.
2016: Africa’s Most Innovative Pension Company of the year 2016 award, conferred  by management and editorial board of AFRICAN QUALITY INSTITUTE publishers of Quality Standard Magazine.The award ceremony was held on Friday, 9 September 2016, at Sheraton Hotel Lagos.

References

Financial services companies established in 2005
2005 establishments in Nigeria
Public pension funds
Pensions in Nigeria
Financial services companies of Nigeria
Nigerian companies established in 2005
Organizations based in Abuja